Chandan Shetty (born 17 September 1989) is an Indian composer, lyricist, and pop singer who works in Kannada films. Shetty gained fame as a solo artist with Kannada singles such as "Halagode", "3 Peg", "Chocolate Girl", "Tequila" "Fire" and "Party Freak.

Career 
Shetty entered the music industry in 2012 as lyricist and assistant music director for the movie Alemaari, under the music director, Arjun Janya. Then he worked for several other movies such as Varadanayaka, Power, Chakravyuha, and Bhajarangi. He was engaged to his co-contestant of Bigg Boss Kannada Season 5, Niveditha Gowda on 21 October. He won in the reality show Bigg Boss Kannada Season 5. He married her on 25 February 2020.

Controversies

August 2020 
Chandan Shetty stoked a controversy by presenting his version of the folk song 'Kolumande Jangamadeva'. A section from the Old Mysuru region has objected to this song claiming that Shetty distorted the very history of Malemadeshwara Swamy, to whom the song is dedicated, thus hurting their religious sentiments. Several people have also objected to the way the song has been depicted. They said that Sharane Sankamma has been insulted in this song and, thus, the entire Sharana tradition has also been insulted by the rap singer.  Following the outrage, Anand Audio Company had deleted the song from YouTube.

October 2019 
During Dasara celebrations of 2019, he proposed to reality TV star Niveditha Gowda on the Yuva Dasara stage, which is meant for cultural events. Chandan was performing at the government-sponsored Dasara programme at the Maharaja’s College grounds. District in-charge minister V Somanna said, "I have told the police to issue a show-cause notice. We will consider action as per the law. It is wrong to misuse the platform."

May 2022

He Promoted MPL, Junglee Rummy and other gambling apps

Discography

As music composer

Singles - Youtube Channels

Television

References

External links

See also
 Alok R. Babu

Indian male playback singers
Living people
1989 births
Indian male composers
21st-century Indian composers
Kannada film score composers
Kannada playback singers
Reality show winners
Big Brother (franchise) winners
Male film score composers
Bigg Boss Kannada contestants
Telugu film score composers
Telugu playback singers
21st-century Indian male singers
21st-century Indian singers